A laundromat (laundrette) is a self-service laundry facility.

Laundromat may also refer to:

 Laundry machines at self-service laundries
 The Laundromat Project, a community self-service laundry project in New York City
 "Laundromat", a Westinghouse trademark; see List of generic and genericized trademarks
 Money laundering schemes
 Russian Laundromat aka "The Laundromat", a 2010s money laundering scheme
 Azerbaijani laundromat, a 2010s money laundering scheme
 The Laundromat Cafe, a chain of Scandinavian cafes
 The Laundromat (1985 film), a 1985 American television film
 The Laundromat (2019 film), a 2019 American film
 "Laundromat" (song), a 2003 single and 2001 song by Nivea off her eponymous debut album Nivea
 "Laundromat" (Rory Gallagher song), a 1971 song by Rory Gallagher off his eponymous debut album Rory Gallagher (album)
 "The Laundromat" (song), a 1997 song by the Jerky Boys off the album The Jerky Boys 4

See also

 American Laundromat Records, a U.S. record label
 
 Launderette (disambiguation)
 Laundry